Inthaeron is a monotypic genus of Asian araneomorph spiders in the family Cithaeronidae, containing the single species, Inthaeron rossi. It was first described by Norman I. Platnick in 1991, and has only been found in India. Females can be distinguished from those of its sister genus, Cithaeron, by the arrangement of cylindrical gland spigots on the posterior median spinnerets, appearing in two rows rather than in clusters. The name is derived from "India", the country it was first found in, and "Cithaeron", the name of the other genus of Cithaeronidae.

Species 
The only species in the genus is Inthaeron rossi. It was initially found in Mahabaleshwar, Maharashtra, India, though it has also been found in Betul, Madhya Pradesh. Only the female characters were known until 1994, when a male specimen was finally captured and identified, bearing the distinctive, highly coiled embolus.

They have a greenish-brown cephalothorax and yellowish-brown legs. Their abdomen is about twice as long as the carapace, and is mostly light brown and hairy with several stripes of various colors. The species name is derived from one of the specimen's collectors.

References

Cithaeronidae
Monotypic Araneomorphae genera
Spiders of the Indian subcontinent